Where It All Began may refer to:
Where It All Began (Bo Diddley album), 1972
Where It All Began (Matthew Morrison album)
Where It All Began (Dan + Shay album)